In probability theory, an elementary event, also called an atomic event or sample point, is an event which contains only a single outcome in the sample space. Using set theory terminology, an elementary event is a singleton. Elementary events and their corresponding outcomes are often written interchangeably for simplicity, as such an event corresponding to precisely one outcome.

The following are examples of elementary events:
 All sets  where  is a  real number. Here  is a random variable with a normal distribution and  This example shows that, because the probability of each elementary event is zero, the probabilities assigned to elementary events do not determine a continuous probability distribution.

Probability of an elementary event

Elementary events may occur with probabilities that are between zero and one (inclusively). In a discrete probability distribution whose sample space is finite, each elementary event is assigned a particular probability. In contrast, in a continuous distribution, individual elementary events must all have a probability of zero.

Some "mixed" distributions contain both stretches of continuous elementary events and some discrete elementary events; the discrete elementary events in such distributions can be called atoms or atomic events and can have non-zero probabilities.

Under the measure-theoretic definition of a probability space, the probability of an elementary event need not even be defined.

See also

References

Further reading

 
 

Experiment (probability theory)